Bitecta is a genus of moths in the subfamily Arctiinae. It is considered a synonym of Teulisna by some authors.

Species
If the genus is accepted, it consists of at least the following species:
 Bitecta diastropha Rothschild, 1920
 Bitecta flaveola Rothschild, 1912
 Bitecta murina Heylaerts, 1891
 Bitecta xanthura Rothschild, 1920

References

External links
Natural History Museum Lepidoptera generic names catalog

Lithosiini